DXBM (90.7 FM), broadcasting as 90.7 Love Radio, is a radio station owned and operated by Manila Broadcasting Company. The station's studio is located inside the MBC Compound, R. Castillo Ave. cor. Gov. Vicente Duterte, Agdao, Davao City and its transmitter is located along Broadcast Ave., Shrine Hills, Matina, Davao City.

References

Radio stations in Davao City
Radio stations established in 1986
Love Radio Network stations